UltraFly Model Corporation was a Taiwan-based manufacturer of intermediate and advanced almost ready-to-fly electric radio controlled aircraft whose airframe parts were injection molded from EPS foam. They produced a line of brushless motors and brushless-compatible electronic speed controls as well. The products were distributed worldwide by U.S. based Great Planes of Champaign, Illinois

The company was formed 1 May 2003 by general manager Charlie Hua. Hua, an expert in the field of information technology as well as an avid RC pilot, approached the design and manufacturing of his models from a market research viewpoint by determining the strengths and weaknesses in the ARF aircraft market, both foam and more traditional balsa/covering models. After determining that there was too much competition in the balsa market, Hua turned his attention to injection molded foam even over laser-cut foam for more consistent quality and the ability to create more complex shapes than would be possible with either laser cut or balsa. Injection molded foam planes of this type are also resistant to crash damage and are easily repaired after hard landings and minor crashes.

UltraFly's goal was to determine the benchmarks of the size of the electric aircraft they would be competing against. They settled on 400-class "park flyer" class aircraft with a retail price of US$85–100 ($95–110 European/Japanese).

According to UltraFly's website, Hua and his team based their product line around these criteria:

Flying Weight: 450-750 g 
Wingspan: 75–120 cm
Motor: Special wind Mabuchi 380-class motor 
Gearing Options: 1.9, 2.4, 3.0, 3.9:1 
Cell Count: 8-10 Ni-MH 1100 mAh cells 
Power: 65-105 W 
 
This approach, though simple, was rather novel. Hua felt that concentrating on the development of a single power plant, one easily optimized through gearing and propeller choices, the system could be used in a variety of aircraft including pusher-prop, jet-styled planes. Hua takes a personal interest in his product line and is not only a frequent contributor on a number of R/C online bulletin boards but personally represents UltraFly at hobby and model shows.

All UltraFly models come with a Falcon 400 motor which is the equivalent of the aforementioned Mabuchi, but all are easily upgraded to brushless operation with the addition of the proper speed control. The UltraFly Cessna 182 has the added advantage of two sets of wings.  The so-called "beginner" wing has a relatively flat airfoil and thick leading edge for stability while preventing inverted flight and the possibility of a crash by an inexperienced pilot. The nearly identical-looking "advanced" wing features a semi-symmetrical airfoil and thinner leading edge. This combination, in conjunction with the proper propeller and battery, allows full aerobatics and will double the Cessna's airspeed to nearly 50 mph (80 km/h). Depending on preference, skill and the surface of the field, the 182 can be built with tricycle landing gear and steerable nosewheel per the prototype or as a taildragger less the nosewheel in the style of the Cessna 180. However, this configuration does not allow the model to be taxied.

Ultrafly closed its business in August 2008

Model lineup

These links are to articles on the full-scale prototypes:

Sukhoi SU-27 jet
F-16 Fighting Falcon jet
BAE Hawk jet
PC-9 low-wing military trainer, sometimes referenced as the T-6A Texan II
Extra 300S low-wing aerobatic sport plane
Cessna 182
Furious 3-D biplane
Outrage 3-D biplane

References

External links
 Ultrafly Model manuals

2008 disestablishments in Taiwan
Defunct companies of Taiwan